Robertson Massif is a rugged, mainly ice-covered massif, 7 miles long, located north of Pa Tio Tio Gap. The feature includes Mount Gauss and Mount Chetwynd and forms the north segment of Kirkwood Range. Named after William Robertson, Chief Executive Officer and Surveyor-General of the Department of Survey and Land Information, 1988–96; directed programs for Antarctic surveying, mapping and place naming; currently a member of SCAR.

Mountains of Victoria Land
Scott Coast